Markus Lund Nakkim (born 21 July 1996) is a Norwegian professional footballer who plays as a defender for Orange County SC.

Club career
Nakkim joined Vålerenga's youth academy in his mid teens, having previously been at KFUM Oslo. In 2012, he won the NTF U16 Cup while playing for Vålerenga's youth team. He signed his first professional contract with the first team ahead of the 2015 season. On 17 April 2015, Nakkim made his league debut against Haugesund.

In February 2018, Nakkim joined Viking on loan until the end of the 2018 season.

Career statistics

Notes

References

External links
 
 Markus Nakkim at altomfotball.no 

1996 births
Living people
Footballers from Oslo
Association football defenders
Norwegian footballers
Norway under-21 international footballers
Vålerenga Fotball players
Viking FK players
Strømmen IF players
Mjøndalen IF players
Hamarkameratene players
Orange County SC players
Eliteserien players
Norwegian First Division players
Norwegian Second Division players